Smith Snyder is an American former Negro league outfielder who played in the 1940s.

Snyder played for the New York Cubans in 1943. In 11 recorded games, he posted three hits in 28 plate appearances.

References

External links
 and Seamheads

Year of birth missing
Place of birth missing
New York Cubans players